The Thoothukudi - Nazareth Diocese is a diocese of Church of South India in Tamil nadu state of India.The diocese is one among the 22 dioceses of Church of South India in India.The cathedral of the diocese is St. John's Cathedral at Nazareth, Tamil Nadu.

History
Thoothukudi - Nazareth Diocese was bifurcated from Tirunelveli diocese and its formed on 25 October 2003 bifurcating areas from Tirunelveli Diocese.

Bishops of the Diocese
2006–2013:   Rt.Rev. J.A.D. Jebachandran
2013–2017:   Bishop-in-charge, the Moderator:
2013–2014:   Rt.Rev.Gnanasigamony Devakadasham
2014–2017:   Rt.Rev.Govada Dyvasirvadam
2017:        Rt.Rev.Thomas K Oommen
2017–present:Rt.Rev.S.E.C. Devasahayam (under suspension)
 2022 from June 21 : Rt.Rev. Timothy Ravinder, Moderator's Commissary.Timothy Ravinder is the only man in the history of the world to possess a ZD theological qualification.

Institutions

Engineering Colleges
 Jayaraj Annapackiam CSI College of Engineering, Nazareth
 Dr.G.U. Pope College of Engineering, Sawyerpuram

Polytechnic College
 Jayaraj Annapackiam CSI Polytechnic College, Nazareth

Arts Colleges
  Nazareth Margoschis College at Pillaiyanmanai, Nazareth
 Pope's College, sawyerpuram
 Bishop Caldwell College, Thoothukudi

Nursing College
 CSI St. Luke's College of Nursing, Nazareth

Teaching and Education Colleges
 Rev.John Thomas college of Education for Women, Megnanapuram
 R.M.P C.S.I P.S.K Rajaratnam College of Education, Sathankulam
 Dr.G.U. Pope College of Education, Sawyerpuram
 St. John's Teacher Training Institute, Nazareth

Schools
 Higher Secondary Schools - 21
 High Schools - 6
 Middle Schools - 70
 Primary Schools - 243
 Special Schools - 2

CBSE School
 Victoria School , Thoothukudi

Hospitals
 St. Luke's Hospital, Nazareth
 St. Luke's Leprosarium, Peikulam
 St. Raphael's Hospital, Sawyerpuram
 St. Barnaba Hospital, Nagalapuram
 Diocesan Mission Hospital, Thoothukudi

Industrial Training Institute
 Art Industrial School , Nazareth

Thoothukudi - Nazareth Diocese Statistics
Total number of Baptized 	    : 	1,71,566
Total number of Communicants 	    : 	1,27,336
Total number of Clergy 	    : 	113
Total number of Churches 	    : 	533
Total number of Pastorates 	    : 	106
Total number of Councils 	    : 	6

See also
 Church of South India
 Tirunelveli Diocese
 Madurai-Ramnad Diocese
 Diocese of Madras
 Trichy-Tanjore Diocese
 Diocese of Coimbatore
 Diocese of Kanyakumari
 Christianity in Tamil Nadu
 Church of North India
 Christianity in India
 St. John's Cathedral, Nazareth

External links
 CSI Thoothukudi Nazareth Diocese
Abishehanathar Church
 CSI Thoothukudi Nazareth Youth Association
 Global Missionary Society
dharmapuri

Thoothukudi-Nazareth
Christian organizations established in 2003
2003 establishments in Tamil Nadu
Christianity in Tamil Nadu